Thomas Peter Daly (February 7, 1866 – October 29, 1938) was an American second baseman and catcher who played in Major League Baseball from 1884 to 1903. He played for the Philadelphia Keystones, Chicago White Stockings, Washington Nationals, Brooklyn Bridegrooms/Grooms/Superbas, Chicago White Sox, and Cincinnati Reds.

In 1568 games over 17 seasons, Daly posted a .278 batting average (1583-for-5701) with 1025 runs, 262 doubles, 103 triples, 49 home runs, 811 runs batted in, 687 bases on balls, 385 stolen bases, .361 on-base percentage, and .386 slugging percentage.

His brother, Joe Daly, also played professional baseball.

See also
 List of Major League Baseball career triples leaders
 List of Major League Baseball career runs scored leaders
 List of Major League Baseball career stolen bases leaders
 List of Major League Baseball annual doubles leaders

References

1866 births
1938 deaths
19th-century baseball players
Major League Baseball second basemen
Major League Baseball catchers
Philadelphia Keystones players
Chicago White Stockings players
Washington Nationals (1886–1889) players
Brooklyn Bridegrooms players
Brooklyn Grooms players
Brooklyn Superbas players
Chicago White Sox players
Cincinnati Reds players
New York Yankees coaches
Minor league baseball managers
Trenton Trentonians players
Newark Domestics players
Meriden Maroons players
Newark Little Giants players
Milwaukee Brewers (minor league) players
Milwaukee Creams players
Providence Grays (minor league) players
Altoona Mountaineers players
Johnstown Johnnies players
Baseball players from Philadelphia
Burials at Holy Cross Cemetery, Brooklyn